Rani G. Whitfield, M.D. (born March 8, 1969) is a family physician and an author best known for his appearances on BET's series 106 & Park and iVillage. He is also the medical correspondent for the nationally syndicated Chuck D radio show on the Air America radio network. He resides in his native Baton Rouge, LA, USA.

Education 
Whitfield received a Bachelor of Science in Microbiology from Southern University in 1992. He completed his Medical Degree in 1996 at Meharry Medical College, and performed his internship and residency at St. Elizabeth Medical Center in Dayton, OH. He received his Sports Medicine Fellowship from the Ohio State University in 2000.

Professional career 
A contributor to the bestselling book, Not In My Family: AIDS in the African American Community], Dr. Whitfield was a featured speaker on talk show host Tavis Smiley's 2007 Road to Health Tour. He also writes a bi-weekly health column for the Electronic Urban Report and is a medical contributor to AOL Black Voices. In June 2007, Dr. Whitfield was featured in I Am A Father, a book edited by David Manuel about African American fatherhood. Also featured in the book included rapper Big Boi, Morgan Freeman, Ossie Davis, Kevin Lyles, Sidney Poitier, and Bishop Eddie Long to name a few.

He is currently at work on The Five Points of Health, a practical guide on how American youth can take care of themselves and live healthy.

Creator of the Tha Hip Hop Doc, Dr. Whitfield is an spokesperson for the American Heart Association and a Board Member for the organization's Southern Affiliates. He is also an member of the American Academy for Family Practice; American College of Sports Medicine; American Medical Society for Sports Medicine; Louisiana State Medical Association; and East Rouge Parish Medical Society. Also, on September 2, 2010, he attended and talked to six eighth grade classes from St. Martin Parish, Louisiana in Cade, Louisiana about making healthy decisions.

References

External links 
 

1969 births
Living people